Orvault is a commune in the Loire-Atlantique department in western France.

It is the fourth-largest suburb of the city of Nantes, and is adjacent to it on the northwest.

Population

See also
Communes of the Loire-Atlantique department

References

External links
 Official website 

Communes of Loire-Atlantique